The Great Ngaruawahia Music Festival was the first large outdoor music festival in New Zealand. It was held on a farm at Ngāruawāhia on the Waikato River, 19 kilometres north-west of Hamilton, for three days from 6 to 8 January 1973.

Management 
 Robert Raymond
 Barry Coburn

Performers 
 Corben Simpson (NZ) - opening act
 Black Sabbath (UK)
 Fairport Convention (UK)
 Blerta (NZ)
 Dragon (NZ)
 The La De Das
 Mammal (NZ)
 Max Merritt & The Meteors
 Split Enz (NZ)
 Lindsay Marks (NZ)
 Bulldogs Allstar Goodtime Band (NZ)
 Billy TK's Powerhouse (NZ)
 Orb
 Butler (NZ)
 Ticket (NZ)
 Itambu (NZ)
 Treefoot (NZ)
 Teddy and the Bears (NZ)

Publicity 
 Corben Simpson removed all his clothes on stage and was reported nationwide in the media, Black Sabbath burned a cross on the hill while getting the entire audience to light a match or lighter. 
 Ticket never appeared. They were scheduled to appear and to tour Australia and Canada with Black Sabbath but singer Trevor Tombleson had a throat infection and guitarist Eddie Hansen's 'beloved yellow rig' was blown up by Sabbath's guitarist who was using it onstage without permission. Hansen refused to go on after that.
 "Todd (Hunter) ... gathered some friends and fellow performers for an appearance at the Great Ngaruawahia Music Festival. They wrote original songs for their set list, and someone pulled the name "Dragon" out of an I Ching book. Their performance at the Ngaruawahia Music Festival led to a better gig, a few weeks performing at the Occidental Hotel in Auckland."

See also

List of historic rock festivals
 New Zealand music festivals

References

 Keith Newman, personal interview with Ticket members including Eddie Hansen

External links 
 Te Ara - the Encyclopedia of New Zealand
 Bruce Sergent New Zealand Music
 Australasian music and popular culture 1964-1975

Music festivals in New Zealand
1973 in music
Ngāruawāhia
Music festivals established in 1973
Rock festivals in New Zealand
Pop music festivals
Heavy metal festivals in New Zealand
1973 music festivals